Samuel Prince Blott (19 June 1886 – 31 January 1969), sometimes known as Prince Blott, was an English professional football forward who played in the Football League for Manchester United and Newport County. He also played in the Southern League for Plymouth Argyle, Southend United and Bradford Park Avenue.

Personal life 
Blott served as a private in the Army Veterinary Corps during the First World War.

Career statistics

References 

1886 births
1969 deaths
English footballers
Bradford (Park Avenue) A.F.C. players
Manchester United F.C. players
Southend United F.C. players
Plymouth Argyle F.C. players
Newport County A.F.C. players
Brentford F.C. wartime guest players
Royal Army Veterinary Corps soldiers
British Army personnel of World War I
English Football League players
Southern Football League players
Dartford F.C. players
Association football forwards